Disca thailandi is a moth of the family Erebidae and it first described by Michael Fibiger in 2007. It originates from mid-western Thailand.

The wingspan is 11–13 mm. The forewing is relatively broad. The hindwing is greyish brown and the underside is a unicoloured greyish brown.

References

Micronoctuini
Moths described in 2007
Taxa named by Michael Fibiger